Murat Aygün (born 13 December 1988) is a Dutch-Turkish kickboxer, currently competing in the light heavyweight division of ONE Championship. Aygün previously fought in the SUPERKOMBAT.

As of February 2022, he is the #6 ranked heavyweight according to Combat Press. Combat Press has ranked him in the heavyweight top ten since March 2019.

Kickboxing career

Early career
Aygün made his professional debut against Raoumaru at Rise 100 – Blade 0 on July 12, 2014. He scored an early knockdown with a combination of a left hook and right straight, which elicited a standing down call from the referee. Aygün ended the fight, after the action resumed, with a right hook.

Aygün was scheduled to face Nobu Hayashi at the inaugural BLADE event on December 29, 2014. He won the fight by a second-round technical knockout.

Aygün was scheduled to face Atha Kasapis at Champions Night on April 23, 2016. He won the fight by a third-round technical knockout, as the ringside doctor stopped the fight with 5 seconds left in the round. The two of them were scheduled to fight an immediate rematch for the ISKA Oriental Rules World Super Heavyweight title at K-1 Germany GP on May 21, 2016. He won the fight by decision.

SUPERKOMBAT
Peter Aerts's Aygün was expected to make his SUPERKOMBAT promotional debut against Cătălin Moroșanu in the main event of Superkombat World Grand Prix in Mamaia on July 30, 2016. However, it was reported Moroșanu was pulled out from the event due to undisclosed reason and he was replaced by short-notice replacement Sebastian Cozmâncă. Aygün won the fight by decision, after an extension round was fought.    

Prince Ali was scheduled to fight Prince Ali for the HEAT Kick Heavyweight title at HEAT 38 on September 25, 2016. He won the fight by a third-round technical knockout.

Aygün was scheduled to fight Tarik Khbabez for the MIX Fight Gala Heavyweight title at Mix Fight Gala 20 on December 3, 2016. He won his third career title fight by decision, after an extra round was fought.

Dutch circuit
Aygün was scheduled to face the 2008 K-1 Grand Prix winner Errol Zimmerman for the WFL Heavyweight title at WFL – Champion vs. Champion on April 23, 2017. Although he was successful in the first round, Zimmerman managed to knock Aygün down with a left hook in the second round. Aygün recovered in between the rounds and won the fight by unanimous decision, winning the first and third rounds on the judges' scorecards.

Aygün was scheduled to face Henriques Zowa in a non-title bout at WFL: Manhoef vs. Bonjasky, Final 16 on October 29, 2017. He won the fight by decision.

Aygün participated in a one-night World Fighting League tournament, held on September 22, 2018. He was scheduled to face Fabio Kwasi in the quarterfinals. He won the fight by unanimous decision, and beat Sam Tevette in the same manner in the semifinals. Aygün won the tournament with a decision win against Nordine Mahieddine in the finals. He earned a reported €100 000 for winning the tournament.

Aygün was scheduled to face James McSweeney in the semifinals of the Mix Fight heavyweight tournament, held at Mix Fight 27 on December 7, 2019. McSweeney won the fight by a second-round technical knockout, after the ringside doctor stopped the bout due to a cut on Aygün's face.

Aygün was scheduled to fight Levi Rigters for the Enfusion Super Heavyweight title at Enfusion 95 on February 29, 2020, but the fight fell through due to a disagreement between Rigters and Enfusion co-promoter Ringfight Promotions. Aygün was instead scheduled to fight Mohamed El Bouchaibi. El Bouchaibi by decision.

ONE Championship
On June 1, 2020 it was revealed that Aygün had signed with ONE Championship. He was scheduled to fight Roman Kryklia for the ONE Kickboxing Light Heavyweight Championship during ONE Championship: Big Bang. The fight was later cancelled, as one of Kryklia's coaches tested positive for COVID-19. Aygun was rescheduled to fight Anderson Silva. Aygun went on to defeat Silva by unanimous decision.

Aygün was scheduled to challenge the reigning ONE Kickboxing Light Heavyweight champion Roman Kryklia at ONE Championship: NextGen on October 29, 2021. Aygün later withdrew from the bout, for undisclosed reasons. Aygün was rebooked against Roman Kryklia for January 14, 2022 at ONE: Heavy Hitters. The fight was later postponed for  ONE: Full Circle on February 25, 2022. Aygün lost the fight via first-round knockout.

Titles and accomplishments
 World Fighting League
 2018 World Fighting League Tournament Heavyweight Champion
 2017 World Fighting League Heavyweight Champion
 Mix Fighting Championship
 2016 Mix Fight Gala Heavyweight Champion
 HEAT
 2016 HEAT Kick Heavyweight Champion
 International Sport Karate Association
 2016 ISKA Oriental Rules World Super Heavyweight Champion

Professional kickboxing record

|- style="background:#fbb;"
| 2022-02-25 || Loss ||align=left| Roman Kryklia || ONE: Full Circle || Kallang, Singapore || KO (Kick to the Body and Punches)	 || 1 || 2:32 || 17–2 
|-
! style=background:white colspan=9 |
|- style="background:#cfc;"
| 2020-12-04 || Win ||align=left| Anderson Silva || ONE Championship: Big Bang  || Kallang, Singapore || Decision (Unanimous) || 3 || 3:00 ||17–1
|- style="background:#cfc;"
| 2020-02-29 ||  Win ||align=left| Mohamed El Bouchaibi || Enfusion 95  || Eindhoven, Netherlands || Decision (Unanimous) || 3 || 3:00 ||16–1
|-  bgcolor="#FFBBBB"  
| 2019-12-07 || Loss ||align=left| James McSweeney|| Mix Fight 27 Heavyweight Tournament, Semi Final || Frankfurt, Germany || TKO (Doctor Stoppage/Cut)|| 2 || ||15–1
|-  bgcolor="#CCFFCC"  
| 2018-09-22 || Win ||align=left| Nordine Mahieddine || WFL: Final 8, Final || Almere, Netherlands || Decision || 3 || 3:00 ||15–0
|-
! style=background:white colspan=9 |
|-  bgcolor="#CCFFCC"  
| 2018-09-22 || Win ||align=left| Sam Tevette || WFL: Final 8, Semi Finals || Almere, Netherlands || Decision || 3 || 3:00 ||14–0
|-  bgcolor="#CCFFCC"  
| 2018-09-22 || Win ||align=left| Fabio Kwasi || WFL: Final 8, Quarter Finals || Almere, Netherlands || Decision || 3 || 3:00 ||13–0
|-  bgcolor= "#CCFFCC"
| 2017-10-29 || Win ||align=left| Henriques Zowa || WFL: Manhoef vs. Bonjasky, Final 16 || Almere, Netherlands || Decision || 3 || 3:00 ||12–0
|-  style="background:#CCFFCC;"
| 2017-04-23 || Win ||align=left| Errol Zimmerman  || WFL – Champion vs. Champion|| Almere, Netherlands || Decision || 5 || 3:00 ||11–0
|-
! style=background:white colspan=9 |
|-  bgcolor="#CCFFCC"
| 2016-12-03 || Win ||align=left| Tarik Khbabez || Mix Fight Gala 20 || Frankfurt, Germany || Extra Round Decision  || 4 || 3:00 ||10–0
|-
! style=background:white colspan=9 |
|-  bgcolor="#CCFFCC"
| 2016-09-25 || Win ||align=left| Prince Ali || HEAT 38|| Nagoya, Japan || TKO (Referee Stoppage) || 3 || 2:03  ||9–0
|-
! style=background:white colspan=9 |
|-  bgcolor="#CCFFCC"
| 2016-07-30 || Win ||align=left| Sebastian Cozmâncă || Superkombat World Grand Prix: Moroșanu vs. Aygün || Constanța, Romania || Extra Round Decision || 4 || 3:00 ||8–0
|-  bgcolor="#CCFFCC"
| 2016-05-21|| Win ||align=left| Atha Kasapis|| K-1 Germany GP || Stuttgart, Germany || Decision || 3 || 2:55 ||7–0
|-
! style=background:white colspan=9 |
|-  bgcolor="#CCFFCC"
| 2016-04-23|| Win ||align=left| Atha Kasapis|| Champions Night || Istanbul, Turkey || TKO (Doctor Stoppage)|| 3 || 2:55 ||6–0
|-  bgcolor="#CCFFCC"
| 2015-11-21 || Win ||align=left| Konstantin Gluhov || Kunlun Fight 34 || Shenzhen, China || Decision || 3 || 3:00 ||5–0
|-  bgcolor="#CCFFCC"
| 2014-12-29|| Win ||align=left| Nobu Hayashi|| Blade 1 || Japan || TKO (Punches) || 2 ||  0:46 ||3–0
|-  bgcolor="#CCFFCC"
| 2014-10|| Win ||align=left| ||  || || KO  ||  ||  ||2–0
|-  bgcolor="#CCFFCC"
| 2014-07-12|| Win ||align=left| Raoumaru|| Rise 100 – Blade 0 || Japan || KO (Right hook) || 1 ||  1:42 ||1–0
|-
| colspan=9 | Legend:

See also
 List of male kickboxers

References

External links
ONE Championship profile

1988 births
Living people
Dutch male kickboxers
Turkish male kickboxers
Sportspeople from Enschede
Heavyweight kickboxers
Kunlun Fight kickboxers
SUPERKOMBAT kickboxers
ONE Championship kickboxers